Nebo flavipes is a species of scorpions in the family Diplocentridae endemic to Yemen.
.

References

 Simon, 1882 : II. Étude sur les arachnides de l'Yemen méridional. In Viaggio ad Assab nel Mar Rosso, dei signori G. Doria ed O. Beccari con il R. Aviso "Esploratore" dal 16 novembre 1879 al 26 Febbraio 1880. Annali del Museo Civico di Storia Naturale di Genova, vol. 18, p. 207-260.

Animals described in 1882
Invertebrates of the Arabian Peninsula
Diplocentridae